"Recuérdame" ("Remember Me") is La 5ª Estación's second single released from their fourth studio album, Sin Frenos. It features American singer Marc Anthony. The music video was directed by Simon Brand and received a Lo Nuestro nomination for Video of the Year.

Charts

Sales and certifications

References

La 5ª Estación songs
Marc Anthony songs
2009 singles
Songs written by Armando Ávila
2009 songs
Music videos directed by Simon Brand
Songs written by Angel Reyero
Song recordings produced by Armando Ávila